Camelford was a rotten borough in Cornwall which returned two Members of Parliament to the House of Commons in the English and later British Parliament from 1552 to 1832, when it was abolished by the Great Reform Act.

History
The borough consisted of the town of Camelford, a market town in northern Cornwall, and part of the surrounding Lanteglos-by-Camelford parish. Like most of the Cornish boroughs enfranchised or re-enfranchised during the Tudor period, it was a rotten borough from the start.

The right to vote was disputed in the 18th century, but according to a judgment of 1796, belonged to those "free burgesses" who were resident householders paying scot and lot. The number of voters varied as new free burgesses were created, but was estimated to be 31 in 1831. Free burgesses were made only by nomination of the "patron", who owned all the houses in the borough, and the voters always voted in accordance with the patron's instructions.

The patronage, and the borough, changed hands several times. In the 1760s, before the exclusive voting rights of the free burgesses were established, the elections were managed by Charles Phillips for the government, and Camelford was considered a secure Treasury Borough (one where ministers could nominate the MPs as a form of patronage). Later the power of the patron became more complete, and in 1812 The Duke of Bedford was able to sell it for £32,000, forcing its MP, Henry Brougham, to find a new seat as his radical politics were unacceptable to the new owner. From 1814 until the Great Reform Act, the owner was the Earl of Darlington (later Marquess and Duke of Cleveland).

Cleveland was forced to secure his influence by regular payments to the voters, making Camelford one of the most notorious examples of corruption that were cited at the time of the Reform Act. In 1819, after two successive elections had been declared void and all the candidates disqualified for "treating", the writ was suspended, temporarily depriving the borough of its representation, although this only lasted until a new Parliament was summoned the following year. The Morning Chronicle noted in 1830 that "Everyone has heard of what Camelford cost the Marquess of Cleveland till the arrangement with the Marquess of Hertford. The Members who were returned for the marquess paid the voters in £1 notes enclosed in a deal box marked 'China'."

In 1831, the borough had an estimated population of 597, and 110 houses.

Members of Parliament

1553-1640

1640-1832

Notes

References

 Brock, Michael (1973) The Great Reform Act London: Hutchinson
 Brunton, D. & Pennington, D. H. (1954) Members of the Long Parliament London: George Allen & Unwin
 Cobbett, William (1808) Cobbett's Parliamentary History of England, from the Norman Conquest in 1066 to the year 1803" London: Thomas Hansard 
 Courtney, William Prideaux (1889) The Parliamentary Representation of Cornwall to 1832. London: Printed for private circulation (75 copies only)
 Jansson, Maija (ed.) (1988) Proceedings in Parliament, 1614 (House of Commons) Philadelphia: American Philosophical Society
 Philbin, J. Holladay (1965) Parliamentary Representation 1832 - England and Wales New Haven: Yale University Press
 Smith, Henry Stooks (1973) The Parliaments of England from 1715 to 1847, 2nd ed., edited by F. W. S. Craig. Chichester: Parliamentary Reference Publications
 Townshend, Heywood (comp.) (1680) Historical Collections:: or, An exact account of the proceedings of the four last Parliaments of Q. Elizabeth of famous memory: wherein is contained the complete journals both of the Lords and Commons, taken from the original records of their Houses. ... Together with the most considerable passages of the history of those times'' London: Printed for T. Basset, W. Crooke, and W. Cademan 
 British History Online - list of speakers in the Parliaments of 1656 and 1658-9

Further reading

 

Constituencies of the Parliament of the United Kingdom established in 1552
Constituencies of the Parliament of the United Kingdom disestablished in 1832
Parliamentary constituencies in Cornwall (historic)
Rotten boroughs
Camelford